Coregone di Campotosto is a traditional fish dish from Abruzzo; typical fish of Campotosto Lake this fish of subalpine origin that has found an ideal habitat in this lake. A request for recognition of native species was made to the Ministry. Thanks also to the very clean waters and selected nutrients, the quality of the whitefish meat is excellent and lends itself very well to the different ways of preparation. The fish is cooked roasted on the grill and then marinated in a preparation of vinegar and with oil and chilli pepper.

See also
 Cuisine of Abruzzo
 List of fish dishes

References

External links

Fish dishes
Cuisine of Abruzzo